"Along Comes a Woman" is a song written by Peter Cetera and Mark Goldenberg for the group Chicago and recorded for their album Chicago 17 (1984), with Cetera singing lead vocals. The fourth single released from that album, it is the last Chicago single released with original singer/bassist Cetera, who left the band in the summer of 1985.

Upon its release in 1985, Billboard magazine highlighted the single in its "Singles: Pop: Picks" section, as a "new release with the greatest chart potential," and called it a "hard rocker." At the end of the year, Billboard magazine music critic, Linda Moleski, listed the single among her top ten highlights of the year as, “An excellent funk-pop sound that’s reflective of 1985.”

The original album version was 4:14 in length. It was remixed to a more high-tech mid-80's sound for the single release which runs 3:47 in length.

Music video
The music video, shot in black and white, combined themes from the films Raiders of the Lost Ark and Casablanca and featured Peter Cetera, the lead vocalist on the song, in the Indiana Jones/Rick Blaine-type role. It was produced by Jon Small of Picture Vision, Inc., and was directed by Jay Dubin, who also directed the syndicated TV series The Wombles in the 1980s. The video was released in 1985, during what some call the "golden era" of MTV.

Personnel
Peter Cetera – lead and background vocals
Bill Champlin – keyboards, guitars, background vocals
Robert Lamm – keyboards, background vocals
Lee Loughnane – trumpet
James Pankow – trombone, horn arrangements
Walter Parazaider – woodwinds
Danny Seraphine – drums
Chris Pinnick — guitar
Additional personnel
Michael Landau – guitar
Paul Jackson, Jr. – guitar
Mark Goldenberg – guitar, additional arrangements
Paulinho da Costa – percussion
David Foster – keyboards, synth bass, synthesizer programming, rhythm and vocal arrangements
John Van Tongeren – synthesizer programming
Erich Bulling – synthesizer programming
Marcus Ryle – synthesizer programming
Gary Grant – trumpet
Greg Adams – trumpet
Kenny Cetera – background vocals

Chart performance

References

1984 songs
1985 singles
Chicago (band) songs
Songs written by Peter Cetera
Songs written by Mark Goldenberg
Song recordings produced by David Foster
Full Moon Records singles
Warner Records singles
Black-and-white music videos